Freistadt is a town in Upper Austria.

Freistadt may also refer to:

Freistadt, Wisconsin, a community in Wisconsin, USA
Free City of Danzig (Freie Stadt Danzig), Poland
Fryštát, a town in the Czech Republic (German: Freistadt)
Frysztak, Poland (German: Freistadt)
Hlohovec, town in Slovakia (Freistadt an der Waag)

See also
Freistatt
Freistaat
Freiburg (disambiguation)
Freiberg (disambiguation)